Dimitrios Petratos (born 10 November 1992) is an Australian professional footballer who plays as a forward for Indian Super League club Mohun Bagan.

Petratos has played for four different A-League clubs, winning one championship with Brisbane Roar. The majority of Petratos's career has been in the A-League. However, he has played in Malaysia, South Korea, Saudi Arabia, before moving to India.

Club career

Sydney FC 
Petratos made his debut as a substitute for Sydney FC in their Round 13, 1–0 victory over Newcastle Jets at the Sydney Football Stadium during the 2010–11 season. He played continually since his debut off the bench and was in the starting 11 in some games. He scored his first senior A-League goal against Gold Coast United on 8 January 2011 which set Sydney on their way to a 2–0 victory.

Sydney FC secured him to a new two-year professional contract on 13 January 2011, replacing his youth league contract. Petratos secured his position as one of the brightest up and coming talents for Sydney, when he scored a brace against rivals Central Coast Mariners in a 2–2 draw at Bluetounge Stadium. Following a reported bust-up with Zeljko Kalac, Petratos requested for and was granted a release from Sydney FC, allowing him to pursue a move to Malaysian Super League Champions Kelantan.

Kelantan
On 7 December 2012, Petratos made a goalscoring debut for Malaysian side Kelantan in a pre-season friendly against Perlis which ended 5–0. Petratos immediately had a very strong connection and passion with the fans and supporters and in the month of December 2012 continued his goal scoring form, scoring 4 goals in 4 games He then scored another 2 goals against Penang FA on 24 December to take his tally to 6 goals in 5 friendly games.

Foreign player restrictions in the Malaysian Super League meant Petratos played exclusively in the 2013 AFC Cup, where Kelantan were drawn in Group G along with Maziya S&RC, Ayeyawady United and SHB Đà Nẵng. He featured in all 7 matches for Kelantan in the competition, scoring 4 goals as they were knocked out by Kitchee SC at the quarter-final stage.

Brisbane Roar
In June 2013, Petratos was signed by the Roar on a one-year deal, along with former Melbourne Victory defensive midfielder Diogo Ferreira.

On 26 December 2013, Petratos scored his first career hattrick against his former club Sydney FC. On 17 July, Petratos scored the opening goal against Premier League giants Liverpool.

After a poor 2014–15 season, Petratos immediately made amends with a stellar 2015–16 'breakout' season. Petratos capped off a classic comeback victory for the Roar in Round 22 against the Western Sydney Wanderers, contributing a goal and an assist to Roar's 3–2 win. Petratos backed up his best career form with a goal of the season contender against Melbourne City, scoring on the half-volley from 35-metres out. He managed to feature in all of Brisbane's 29 games, finishing with a goal tally of 7 and an equally impressive 5 assists.

Ulsan Hyundai
On 24 January 2017, Petratos was signed, along with his brother Kosta by Newcastle Jets on a 3-year contract, starting in the 2017–18 season. However, less than two weeks later, he accepted an offer to join Korean club Ulsan Hyundai on a 3-year deal for a sum of $300,000, which would be split evenly between Newcastle and Brisbane.

Newcastle Jets
On 13 June 2017, following his release from Ulsan Hyundai, Petratos signed a two-year deal with Newcastle Jets.

ATK Mohun Bagan

On 18 July 2022, Petratos joined Indian Super League club ATK Mohun Bagan.

International career
After rumours all season about an international call up Petratos was selected in the Australia squad for the friendlies before the World Cup. Petratos started on the left wing in his international debut against Norway on 24 March 2018, playing 74 minutes before coming off for Robbie Kruse. Petratos made little impact as Australia lost 4–1 to Norway. Petratos started Australia's 2nd friendly on the bench against Colombia on 28 March and was an unused substitute as Australia drew 0–0 with Colombia.

In May 2018, he was named in Australia's 23-man squad for the 2018 World Cup in Russia.

Personal life
Petratos is of Greek ancestry, and comes from a footballing family. His father Angelo played as a defender for Sydney Olympic FC, his younger brother Kosta was his teammate at the Jets, his younger sister Panagiota previously played for the Newcastle W-League team in 2021, His younger brother Maki is currently playing for the Newcastle Jets FC Reserves and his youngest sister Anastasia is currently playing Under 11s at Sydney Olympic FC.

Career statistics

Club

International

Honours
Brisbane Roar
 A-League Premiership: 2013–14
 A-League Championship: 2013–14

Australia U19
 AFF U-19 Youth Championship: 2010
 AFC U-19 Championship runner-up: 2010

Individual
 A-League Young Player of the Month: January 2014, January 2016
 Indian Super League Hero of the Month: October 2022

References

External links

 Sydney FC youth profile
 
 	

1992 births
Australian soccer players
Australian expatriate soccer players
Australian people of Greek descent
Australia international soccer players
Association football forwards
Brisbane Roar FC players
Sydney FC players
Kelantan FA players
Ulsan Hyundai FC players
Newcastle Jets FC players
Al-Wehda Club (Mecca) players
Western Sydney Wanderers FC players
Living people
2018 FIFA World Cup players
A-League Men players
K League 1 players
Saudi Professional League players
Expatriate footballers in Saudi Arabia
Australian expatriate sportspeople in Saudi Arabia
Expatriate footballers in South Korea
Expatriate footballers in Malaysia
Expatriate footballers in India
Australian expatriate sportspeople in South Korea
Australian expatriate sportspeople in Malaysia
Australian expatriate sportspeople in India
Soccer players from Sydney
Australia youth international soccer players